Kevin Kane (born December 18, 1983) is an American football coach and former linebacker, who is the current defensive coordinator for the Purdue Boilermakers. He played college football at Kansas from 2002 to 2005. He served as the defensive coordinator of the Northern Illinois Huskies (2016–2017) and SMU Mustangs (2018–2020).

Playing career
Born in Kansas City, Missouri on December 18, 1983, Kane attended Rockhurst High School, where he helped lead the team to a state championship in his junior season.

Kane played linebacker for the Kansas Jayhawks from 2002 to 2005. He was twice named Honorable Mention All-Big 12, and was Academic All-Big 12 three times. Kane was named a team captain for his senior season.

Coaching career

Kansas
After finishing his playing career in 2005, Kevin Kane spent the next two seasons as a student assistant with his alma mater, Kansas.

Wisconsin
In 2008, he joined the Wisconsin football program, as a defensive graduate assistant for two seasons, and then as a defensive quality control coach in 2010.

Northern Illinois
In 2011, Kane began his first stint as Northern Illinois University. He coached the tight ends and fullbacks in 2011, before moving to the defensive side of the ball from 2012-2014, coaching the linebackers. Kane also coordinated the special teams in 2013 and 2014.

Kansas
For the 2015 football season, Kane returned to his alma mater, coaching the Kansas linebackers. The following year, he returned to Northern Illinois as the teams defensive coordinator and safeties coach.

SMU
In January 2018, it was announced that Kevin Kane would join new head coach Sonny Dykes at SMU as the defensive coordinator.

Illinois
Kane was named the associate head coach & outside linebackers coach at Illinois in January 2021. The move reunited Kane with Bret Bielema, whom he worked under at Wisconsin. In 2022, Kane assisted defensive coordinator Ryan Walters lead one of the top defenses in the Nation. The Fighting Illini defense finished the year in the top 8 in rushing defense, passing defense, total defense, and number one in scoring defense after giving up 12.3 points per game. This stellar performance helped Walters land the head coaching position at Purdue.

Purdue
Following the 2022 season, Kane followed Walters to Purdue as the defensive coordinator.

Personal life
Kane and his wife have three children.

References

External links
 Purdue profile

1983 births
Living people
American football linebackers
Kansas Jayhawks football players
Kansas Jayhawks football coaches
Northern Illinois Huskies football coaches
Purdue Boilermakers football coaches
SMU Mustangs football coaches
Wisconsin Badgers football coaches
Coaches of American football from Missouri
Players of American football from Kansas City, Missouri